Day by Day Entertainment  is an independent hip hop record label and record distribution company based in New York City. It was started in 1999 by MF Grimm before his three-year incarceration starting in 2000.

After a brief hiatus, Day by Day Entertainment was relaunched on August 24, 2009. After several years of relative inactivity the label  released new material by MF Grimm and Ayatollah.

Part of the significance of the label's being a taste-maker of underground hip-hop music is its release of The Downfall of Ibliys: A Ghetto Opera of tracks recorded within 24 hours of going to prison, and American Hunger, which is MF Grimm's three-disc volume of new material recorded in 2006. The releases were well received by Pitchfork.

Artists
 Ayatollah
 Dionté BOOM
 Infinit Evol
 MF Grimm
 Rseenal Di Artillary
 SinSerious

Former artists
 Binkis Recs
 Broady Champs
 Block McCloud
 B-Will
 Cryptic One
 Dub-L
 DNAE
 Cadence
 Chops
 Count Bass D
 John Doe
 Krohme
 Lightheaded
 Megalon (officially with X-Ray's Mindbenda Recordings)
 MF DOOM
 Monsta Island Czars
 Mudville (officially with Slurry Records)
 Prophetix (officially with Asylum Entertainment)
 Rob Swift
 Rodan
 Serengeti
 Stronghold
 Twiz The Beat Pro
 9th Scientist

Discography
B-Will & Infinit EVOL
The Professor & The Mutant (with Complex Sound Design) (2004)
Binkis Recs
The Reign Begins (2002)
Broady Champs
Breakfast of Champions (2006)
Block McCloud
Spittin' Image (2006)
Cadence
The Minds Of The Children (2003)
Chops
Food For Naught (2003)
Count Bass D
Dwight Spitz (2002) (with High Times & Metal Face Records)
Cryptic One
The Anti-Mobius Strip Theory (2004)
Dub-L
Day Of The Mega Beast  (2004)
Jeff Spec
Dark City (2002)
John Doe
Meet John Doe (2003)
Kongcrete
Gorilla Warfare (2003) (with Mindbenda Recordings)
Lightheaded
Pure Thoughts
Megalon
A Penny For Your Thoughts (album)|A Penny For Your Thoughts (2004) (courtesy of Mindbenda Recordings)
MF Grimm
The Downfall of Ibliys: A Ghetto Opera (2002) (with Metal Face Records)
The Best of MF (2003) (with MF DOOM)
Digital Tears: E-Mail From Purgatory (2004) (as Jet-Jaguar)
Special Herbs and Spices Vol. 1 (2004) (with MF DOOM)
Scars and Memories (2005)
American Hunger (2006)
MF Grimm & Stricknine present...The Order Of The Baker: Gingerbread Man Mixtape (2007) (with Toaster Entertainment)
The Hunt For The Gingerbread Man (2007) (with Class A Records)
Story (2009)
You Only Live Twice (2010)
Supreme Excellence (2010)
Monsta Island Czars
Escape from Monsta Island! (2003) (with Metal Face Records)
Mudville
The Glory of Man is not in Vogue (2005) (with Slurry Music & Rock Day By Day)
Prophetix
High Risk (2002) (with Asylum Entertainment)
Rob Swift
Who Sampled This? (2003)
Rodan
Theophany: The Book of Elevations (2004)
Serengeti
Gasoline Rainbows
Stronghold
Stronghold Mixtape, Vol. 2 (2004)

References

External links
 
 Official Discography

Record labels established in 1999
Hip hop record labels
American independent record labels
1999 establishments in New York City